Lily Henriette Greenham (4 January 1924 - 31 October 2001) was an Austrian-born Danish visual artist, performer, composer and leading proponent of sound poetry and concrete poetry.

Early life
Greenham was born in Vienna, Austria, on January 4, 1924, the only child of Rena (née Pfiffer) and Dr. Gabriel Lax, both of Polish-Jewish descent. Her mother was a well-known coloratura opera singer who performed at the Vienna Volksoper, Vienna State Opera, and various international venues during the 1920s and ‘30s. Her father was a lawyer, impresario and former police commissioner from Berezhany. Her parents divorced in 1929 and her mother later remarried to Danish singer Egon Madsen in Copenhagen in 1933.

In April 1938 her father was amongst the first wave of prominent Jewish citizens arrested in Vienna and transported to Dachau concentration camp, following the annexation of Austria into the German Reich.  Greenham escaped to Copenhagen to be reunited with her mother thanks to the efforts of her step-father who obtained an exit visa for her. At fifteen Greenham’s mother started giving her formal singing lessons and she learnt a repertoire of lieder and operatic arias. Madsen later secured the release of Greenham's father from Buchenwald concentration camp in November 1938. Her father travelled on to Shanghai to work as a journalist, where as many as 20,000 German, Austrian and Polish Jews sought refuge during World War Two. He died there in April 1944.

Following the German occupation of Denmark in 1940, Greenham’s mother attempted to escape to Sweden in October 1943 with a group of Danish Jews. A 'Kripo' (Kriminalpolizei) patrol discovered them and Greenham’s mother was shot in the stomach and died of her wounds. According to Egon Madsen's memoirs, Greenham had affected her own dramatic escape by boat to Sweden some days earlier, hiding in ditches and a church attic to escape Nazi patrols.

After the war Greenham and her step-father toured and performed together in Sweden and Denmark, including a 1947 Danish radio broadcast where they performed pieces by Georges Bizet, Franz Lehár and Anton Rubinstein, appearing as Lily Pfiffer-Madsen. In 1948 Greenham moved to Paris to study painting, subsequently married poet Peter Greenham in London in 1950, before returning to Austria with him in 1952 to study at the Academy of Music and Performing Arts in Vienna. She and Peter Greenham divorced in 1964.

Career and adult life
Whilst studying in Vienna in the 1950s, Greenham developed a strong interest in contemporary art and became involved with the activities of the Wiener Gruppe (Vienna Group), an avant-garde constellation of Austrian poets and writers that included H.C. Artmann and Gerhard Rühm. She became well-known for radio broadcasts and performances of sound & concrete poetry by many writers, poets and artists, including Freidrich Achtleitner, Elena Asins, Alain Arias-Misson, Ronaldo Azeredo, Bob Cobbing, Peter Greenham, Helmut Heißenbüttel and Ernst Jandl. Greenham spoke several languages aside from her native German and adopted Danish, as evidenced in her BBC Radio 3 Sound Poetry Concert in 1970 where she delivered sound poems in their original Spanish, French and English.

In 1964 Greenham had moved back to Paris where she joined the Groupe de Recherche d'Art Visuel (GRAV) (Research Group for Visual Art)) of opto-kinetic artists. Greenham’s innovative Op art works became widely recognised and were shown in several major exhibitions, including Mouvement 2 (Galerie Denise René, Paris, 1964), The Responsive Eye (Museum of Modern Art (MoMa), New York, 1965), Light and Movement (Museum of Modern Art, Paris, 1967), Formas computables (Computer Centre, University of Madrid, 1969) and the 35th Venice Biennale in 1970.
 
Greenham moved to London in 1972, where she based herself for the remainder of her life, and began to focus on her own sound poetry experiments. She consciously distanced herself from being regarded as merely an interpreter of other people’s poetry, particularly as one of the few female practitioners in an overwhelmingly male-dominated field. Her sense of being an outsider was something she wrote about in Un Arte de Vivir (An Art of Living), originally published in the Spanish literary magazine Inventario 5 (1995).

Greenham coined the term ‘lingual music’ in 1973 to describe her experiments with layering and processing reel-to-reel tape recordings of her own voice. She explained her approach in the catalogue for the exhibition Tekst in geluid (Text in sound) at the Stedelijk Museum, Amsterdam, in 1977.

 

In 1974 she worked at the BBC Radiophonic Workshop to realise Relativity, which was broadcast on the BBC the following year, winning a prize for electro-acoustic music at the prestigious 5th Bourges International Festival of Experimental Music in 1975. That same year she worked with the mercurial Hugh Davies at Goldsmiths, University of London, to create her (originally quadrophonic) piece Traffic. On Circulation (1975/6), a stereo French-language version of her poem Traffic, Greenham explored early digital sampling techniques - long before the availability of commercial samplers - using a PDP-8 computer at University College in Cardiff with software created by programmer Marcus West. Greenham continued to perform live throughout the 1970s, including free improvisation performances with Danish saxophonist John Tchicai and the Bob Downes Open Music Trio. In 1976 she toured in Holland with Hugh Davies and Peter Cusack. Greenham again featured at the Bourges International Festival of Experimental Music in 1978, where 7 Consonants in Space, Traffic, and Circulation were performed.

In later life Greenham increasingly devoted her time to writing, making art work using early computer graphics programmes and collaborating with film-makers, including Lis Rhodes & Jo Davis on Hang On A Minute (1983), part of a series of short films created for Channel 4. Greenham died on 31 October 2001 in London, aged 77. 

Lingual Music, a double CD collection of her work, was released by Paradigm Discs in 2007, with liner notes from composer Michael Parsons. Her only published book of poems, Tune in to Reality!, was republished by Distance No Object in 2022, having originally appeared in 1974 as an edition of around 100 copies through Bob Cobbing’s Writers Forum. Her archive is now held at Goldsmiths, University of London.

Discography
Under own name
Internationale Sprachexperimente Der 50/60er Jahre/Tendentious Neo-Semantics 1970 In English, Edition Hoffmann, S-1 (LP) (1970).
Lingual Music; Paradigm Discs, PD22 (2CDs) (2007). 

With various artists
Konkrete Poesie – Sound Poetry – Artikulationen; Anastasia Bitzos (LP) (1966). Limited edition of 100; documentation of performances at Kunsthalle Bern, Switzerland.
Poésie Sonore Internationale 1 & 2, Éditions Jean-Michel Place, K7 No. 1/10006 & K7 No. 2/10007 (2 cassettes) (1979). (Greenham, Lily; Seven Consonants In Space).
Breathingspace/79 (Sound Poetry), Watershed Tapes, C-2003 (2 cassettes) (1979). (Greenham, Lily; 7 Consonants In Space)

References

External links
Pacifica Radio Archives - Ode To Gravity: Sound poetry of Lily Greenham: interview by Charles Amirkhanian (1972).

Lily Greenham art works held by ZKM (Center for Art and Media), Karlsruhe, Germany.

Lily Greenham, Collage (1964) in the collection at the Victoria & Albert Museum, London.

Lily Greenham - Informel, Op Art, Lingual Music (2007), Neue Gallerie Graz, Austria.

Austrian composers
1924 births
2001 deaths